Inna Hryshchun (born 29 September 1994 in Khmelnytskyi) is a Ukrainian canoeist. She competed in the women's K-2 500 metres event at the 2016 Summer Olympics. She also won medals at the European Championships.

References

External links
 

1994 births
Living people
Ukrainian female canoeists
Olympic canoeists of Ukraine
Canoeists at the 2016 Summer Olympics
Sportspeople from Khmelnytskyi, Ukraine
European Games competitors for Ukraine
Canoeists at the 2015 European Games
Canoeists at the 2019 European Games
21st-century Ukrainian women